The Dark Half is a 1993 American horror film adaptation of Stephen King's 1989 novel of the same name. The film was written and directed by George A. Romero and stars Timothy Hutton as Thad Beaumont and George Stark, Amy Madigan as Liz Beaumont, Michael Rooker as Sheriff Alan Pangborn, and Royal Dano in his final film.

Plot
An author of highbrow literary novels, Thad Beaumont (Timothy Hutton), is better known for the bestselling murder mystery suspense-thrillers he writes under the pen name "George Stark". Beaumont wishes to retire the Stark name and symbolically buries Stark in a mock grave.

However, Stark has mysteriously become a physical entity (also portrayed by Hutton) and begins terrorizing Beaumont's family and friends after he emerges from the grave. Stark then kills local photographer Homer Gamache and steals his truck. He also murders Thad's editor, agent, and his agent's ex-wife, and kills a man named Fred Clawson, who was trying to blackmail Thad for "being a con artist that should not have written books under a false name".

When the police suspect Thad of murdering Gamache, he tries to convince Sheriff Alan Pangborn of Castle Rock, Maine that he had nothing to do with it. After putting an all-points bulletin on Clawson, who was accused of the death of Gamache, the New York police find him castrated and his throat slit. They find a message on the wall, written in Clawson's blood, "The sparrows are flying again." Thad starts to think that he may have a psychic connection to the killer.

While in his office, Thad begins to receive messages from Stark, and begins to worry about the next victim. He and his family start to receive threatening phone calls from Stark. Pangborn initially suspects the phone calls are a prank by Thad himself until Stark begins to describe how he is going to kill Thad's family, disturbing Pangborn.

State Police find Homer Gamache's truck with Thad's fingerprints all over it. For some reason, Stark wants to live in the material world, after only appearing in a set of Thad's best selling books.  Thad writes, but he is not alone in suspecting something strange: Sheriff Pangborn is equally suspicious and continues investigating. Thad begins to realize that Stark is, in fact, his parasitic twin brother who died at "childbirth."

His mother never told Thad about the twin, and he was completely unaware until a local doctor tells him that Stark was a fraternal twin that was living inside Thad's brain. (A scene in the film's start shows a developing fetus inside Beaumont's brain). Stark arrives, kills the doctor, and blames Thad for the crime. Thad's colleague Reggie realizes that Stark is an entity controlled by the books that Thad wrote and that Stark will do anything he can to stop Thad. Stark kidnaps Thad's wife Liz and his children, and makes a deal with Thad: finishing a book that depicts Stark living in the real world, or he will kill his family.

While writing the book, Thad notices Stark is healing himself with his writings, as George started to deteriorate due to Thad not writing anymore books, causing Thad to absorb his sickness. Thad and Stark get into a fight, which ends with Thad stabbing Stark in the neck with a pencil. Sheriff Pangborn arrives and unties Liz, who says that Thad and Stark are upstairs. However, a huge flock of sparrows inexplicably comes and tears Stark apart, taking him to the land of the dead. The sparrows are agents of Death, that come to collect souls and carry them to their final destination. Thad and Liz are spared, and they, along with Pangborn, watch as the sparrows disappear into the night.

Cast
Timothy Hutton as Thad Beaumont and George Stark
Amy Madigan as Liz Beaumont
Michael Rooker as Sheriff Alan Pangborn
Julie Harris as Reggie Delesseps
Robert Joy as Fred Clawson
Chelsea Field as Annie Pangborn
Royal Dano as Digger Holt
Rutanya Alda as Miriam Cowley
Beth Grant as Shayla Beaumont
Kent Broadhurst as Mike Donaldson
Tom Mardirosian as Rick Cowley
Glenn Colerider as Homer Gamache

Production
The film was filmed in part at Washington & Jefferson College, near Pittsburgh, Pennsylvania.  Notable in the film are the chapel in the Old Main, seen at the beginning of the film as Beaumont's classroom, and the office of the college chaplain, used as Beaumont's office.  Members of the faculty and student body served as extras in the film.

The residence featured in the film is a home located on Maple Avenue in the Edgewood neighborhood of Pittsburgh, Pennsylvania.

The film was Romero's third foray into filming with the support of a major film production company (after Creepshow and Monkey Shines), causing some problems for the notoriously low-budget director.

The film was shot from October 1990 until March 1991. It was not released for two years because of Orion Pictures' bleak financial situation at the time. The film eventually saw release in April 1993, taking in just over $10 million domestically.

Reception
In its opening week The Dark Half ranked in the box office charts at number 6, gathering a total of $3,250,883 from 1,563 theatres.

Critics gave the film mixed reviews, though they praised Timothy Hutton's performance in the film as well as the screenplay. On Rotten Tomatoes, it currently holds a 59% from 34 reviews with an average score of 5.9/10. The critics consensus reads, ”The Dark Half is a highly serious psychological study that can be faulted for being more curious than actually scary.” 

Roger Ebert gave the film two out of four stars, praising Hutton's against type performance as Stark that "definitively shed his nice-guy image". However, Ebert faulted The Dark Half for failing to "develop its preternatural opening theme" and never offering a satisfactory explanation for Stark's existence.

Awards
Academy of Science Fiction, Fantasy & Horror Films
Saturn Award Best Director - George A. Romero - Nominated
Saturn Award Best Horror Film - Nominated
Saturn Award Best Makeup - John Vulich, Everett Burrell - Nominated
Saturn Award Best Supporting Actress - Julie Harris - Nominated
Fantafestival
Best Actor - Timothy Hutton - Won
Best Film - George A. Romero - Won
Best Screenplay - Paul Hunt, Nick McCarthy - Won

References

External links 
 

 
 
The Dark Half official site at MGM.

1993 films
1993 horror films
1990s psychological thriller films
Films based on works by Stephen King
Films based on American horror novels
Films directed by George A. Romero
Films shot in Pennsylvania
Films set in Maine
Orion Pictures films
American supernatural horror films
Washington County, Pennsylvania
1990s English-language films
American serial killer films
Films about writers
Films scored by Christopher Young
Parasitic twinning in culture
1990s American films